Anuradha Bhattacharyya (born 6 December 1975) is an Indian writer of poetry and fiction in English. Her novel One Word was awarded Best Book of the Year 2016 by the Chandigarh Sahitya Akademi. She is Associate Professor of English in Post Graduate Government College, Sector-11, Chandigarh.

Life and career 
Anuradha Bhattacharyya was born to Tapan Kumar Bhattacharyya and Chitra Bhattacharyya on 6 December 1975 in Calcutta, India. Asoke Kumar Bhattacharyya, the Padma awardee of 2017, was her maternal grandfather. Soon after, her family moved to the Roorkee University campus. She received her education from St. Anne’s Senior Secondary School, Roorkee and Banasthali Vidyapeeth, Rajasthan. She joined Jadavpur University, Calcutta for a Master of Arts degree in English Literature in 1996. While at Jadavpur University, P. Lal published her first book of poems in 1998 via Writers Workshop.

She was Junior Research Fellow in the Departmentof the Humanities and Social Sciences at the Indian Institute of Technology, Kharagpur. She worked in the interdisciplinary research area of psychoanalysis and literature. She received her Doctorate of Philosophy in English Literature in 2005. She joined Post Graduate Government College, Sector-11, Chandigarh as Assistant Professor of English in 2006.

Her poetry has been published in various literary magazines and anthologies worldwide.  Gurdev Chauhan calls her poetry layered.

The Road Taken is her first novel published in April 2015 by Col Mahip Chadha of Creative Crows Publishers, New Delhi. She was also honoured at the annual festival of poets, Amaravati Poetic Prism organized by the Cultural Centre of Vijayawada. She won fifth prize for her story "Painting Black and Blue" in the International Short Story contest by PoiesisOnline in 2018.

Bhattacharyya was conferred the Commendation Award from the Adviser to Chandigarh Administrator for her extensive work in the field of Art & Culture. At Haridwar Literature Festival, December, 2018, she said, "I write about the unique things I have experienced or observed and I publish them for the benefit of the society".

In 2020, she received the Best Book of the Year Award from Chandigarh Sahitya Akademi for her novel Still She Cried. She also received their grant-in-aid for the publication of her book of poems My Dadu on her maternal grandfather Asoke Kumar Bhattacharyya.

Bhattacharyya was one of four jury members for the all India young authors' The Lit Digital Awards 2020.

In June 2021, Mosaïque Press, UK has published a dual language publication named Correnti Incrociate  of 49 poems in English alongside their Italian translations. Anuradha Bhattacharyya features in this book.

Awards and honours 
Chandigarh Sahitya Akademi Best Book of the Year Award 2019 in the category of English Novel, 2020
Commendation Award Republic Day of India, Chandigarh Administration, 2019
Poiesis Award for Excellence in Literature PoiesisOnline, 2018
Chandigarh Sahitya Akademi Best Book of the Year Award 2016 in the category of English Novel, 2017
Sahitya Shree from Kafla Intercontinental, 2016

Selected works

Books 

 Corona Doldrums (poems) (New Delhi: Authors Press 2021 )
 Jadu (novel) (New Delhi: Authors Press 2021 )
 My Dadu (poems) (New Delhi: Adhyaya Books 2020 )
 Still She Cried (novel) (New Delhi: Authors Press 2019 )
 One Word (novel) (New Delhi: Creative Crows Publishers 2016 )
 Twentieth Century European Literature – a cultural baggage (academic book) (New Delhi: Creative Crows Publishers 2016 )
 The Road Taken (novel) (New Delhi: Creative Crows Publishers 2015 )
 The Lacanian Author (academic work) (Chandigarh: Kafla Intercontinental 2015 )
 Lofty – to fill up a cultural chasm (poems) (Kolkata: Writers Workshop 2015 )
 Knots (poems) (Kolkata: Writers Workshop 2012 )
 Fifty-Five Poems (Calcutta: Writers Workshop 1998 )

Short stories
 "Bus Stand" (in Kafla Intercontinental, Summer 2013, Chandigarh )
 "If you marry, your father will die" (in e-magazine Indian Review)
 "The Cancer" (in Kafla Intercontinental, Jan-April 2014, Chandigarh )
 "Night Bus" (in e journal The Bactrian Room, April 2014)
 "Hey Swamiji !" (in e journal The Bactrian Room, Aug 2014)
 "Big Max" (in e journal The Bactrian Room, Aug 2014)
 "Death by Water" (in Kafla Intercontinental, April 2015, Chandigarh )
 "I love your eyes", (in School Shiksha (print magazine) Dec-Jan 2014-15 & in e-magazine Indian Review.)
 "The Story of a Banana Tree", (in e magazine The Bactrian Room, March 2015, in School Shiksha (print magazine) Feb 2015, & in Little Hands (print magazine) March 2015
 "Classroom" (in Langlit, an online journal, May 2015 )
 "Death by Water" (in Kafla Intercontinental, Summer 2015, Chandigarh )
 "Mother Cow" (in School Shiksha Year-6, Vol 9, Jan 2016, RNI: MPBIL2010/34735,  & in Little Hands, Vol.3 Issue 8, Feb 2016, Thiruvananthapuram, RNI: KERENG/2013/51995)
 "Party" (in Langlit, an online journal, March 2016 )
 "Order Order" (in e-magazine Indian Review, Sept 2016)
 "The Camel & the Horse" (in Songsoptok, The Writers Blog, Kolkata, Feb 2017 & in Little Hands (print magazine) March 2017)
 "The Pumpkin" (in ANURADHASPHERE, Songsoptok, The Writers Blog, Kolkata, March 2017)
 "The Railway Station Hang-over" (in ANURADHASPHERE, Songsoptok, The Writers Blog, Kolkata, April 2017 & in Little Hands (print magazine) April 2017)
 "Painting Black and Blue" (in School Shiksha (print magazine) Jan 2018.
 "A Visit to Balaji" (in ReaderWriterLounge, an online journal, August 2019)
 "Samosa Express" (in Langlit, an online journal, VOL.5 ISSUE-4 2019, May 2019 )
 "Ex Connection" (in Muse India, an online journal, ISSUE-94 2020, Nov-Dec 2020 )

Other publications 
As an academic, Dr. Anuradha Bhattacharyya has published critical essays on Buddhism, Jacques Lacan, August Strindberg, Maxim Gorky, Pirandello, Albert Camus,  Bertolt Brecht, Peter Weiss, Salman Rushdie, Milan Kundera,  Arundhati Roy, Aravind Adiga, Jhumpa Lahiri and Pablo Neruda which are published in various Indian print journals.

See also
 List of Indian writers

References

External links
 News
 News
 Daggers Drawn and other poems
 The Cobra
 The Weapon of Infamy and other poems
 Book Review of Knots
 Book Review of Lofty
 The Bactrian Room
 Indian Review
 Lacan.com
 Indian Literature
 Google Scholar
 Personal Website
 Twitter

1975 births
Living people
Indian women poets
English-language writers from India
Women writers from West Bengal
Indian women novelists
Indian women short story writers
Writers from Kolkata
Novelists from West Bengal
21st-century Indian women writers
21st-century Indian writers
21st-century Indian novelists
Jadavpur University alumni
IIT Kharagpur alumni